Tenzing Tsondu (Tibetan: བསྟན་འཛིན་བརྩོན་འགྲུས་; Chinese: 丁真珍珠; Pinyin: Dīngzhēn Zhēnzhū; born 7 May 2001), known professionally as Ding Zhen (Chinese: 丁真), is a Tibetan singer, Internet celebrity and businessman from Litang, Sichuan Province, China.

Early life
He was a Khampa herdsman who did not finish primary school and barely speaks Mandarin.

Ding Zhen Phenomenon
On 11 November 2020, he became famous on the Internet for a 7-second TikTok  video clip, and was named 'Sweet Wild Boy (Chinese: 甜野男孩; Pinyin: Tianye Nanhai)' by Chinese netizens. Within a few days, his related message was read by over millions people on Sina Weibo. On 18 November, he was recruited by Litang Culture, Tourism and Sports Investment Development Corporation Limited, a local state-owned company to promote the local tourism industry. Other East Asian countries, such as Japan and South Korea, have also covered him. Chinese Foreign Ministry spokesperson Hua Chunying also reposted photos of Ding Zhen on Twitter. The "Ding Zhen phenomenon" has led to a large number of Chinese tourists travelling to Tibetan areas, with a significant increase in orders for destinations such as Kangding airport and Daocheng Yading airport.

However, the Central Tibetan Administration criticised the Chinese government's use of Ding Zhen as propagandistic and not really promoting Tibetan culture, especially their religion.

Works
On 4 February 2021, Ding Zhen released his first album 1376 All Wishes Come True (1376心想事成) in collaboration with a Tibetan band, ANU.

Controversy
Ding Zhen has caused great controversy in China since obtaining a position in a Chinese state-owned enterprise requires fierce competition, including low pass rate exams. Many highly educated job seekers express their dissatisfaction with this.

References

External links
Ding Zhen on Bilibili

21st-century Tibetan male singers
Chinese Internet celebrities
2001 births
Living people